The Prineville Reservoir is in the high desert hills of Central Oregon, Oregon, United States. This reservoir is a popular retreat for most of Central Oregon. It is near the geographic center of Oregon. Prineville Reservoir State Park is managed by the Oregon Parks and Recreation Department.

Prineville Reservoir was created by damming, via the Arthur R. Bowman Dam, the Crooked River upstream from Prineville. The reservoir is part of the U.S. Bureau of Reclamation's Crooked River Project, flooding a juniper- and sagebrush-filled canyon, and was finished in 1961. The dam and reservoir are owned by the Bureau of Reclamation, and operated under contract by Ochoco Irrigation District.

The northeast end of Prineville Reservoir is a designated wildlife management area; these  of both land and water provide a refuge for wildlife.

Fishing 
Fishing can be quite good with rainbow trout, cutthroat trout, smallmouth bass, largemouth bass, catfish, crappie, and crayfish. The trout fishing experience is year-round, with ice fishing in winter.

Boating 

There is no speed limit on the lake and so boating of all kinds is very popular. Water skiing, wakeboarding and tubing are some of the most common sports and about half of the boats on the lake are there for this purpose. There is a marina with a boat ramp.

Camping 

There are two state parks that allow camping, Prineville Reservoir State Park, and Jasper State Recreation Site. Both have facilities and offer RV hookups. There is also a privately owned resort that rents cabins, offers campsites (with hookups), maintains a boat ramp and marina, and also owns a general store and restaurant.

Wildlife 

Prineville Reservoir is a popular place to see waterfowl, shorebirds, and birds of prey in one setting. Spring and fall migrations bring common loon, while in summer blue-winged teal, cinnamon teal, spotted sandpiper, American avocet, and black-necked stilt. Also seen is the bald eagle, golden eagle, osprey, prairie falcon, and red-tailed hawk, black-throated gray warbler, pinyon jay, and ash-throated flycatcher. Willow shrubbery may hold orange-crowned warbler and gray catbird.

Non-avian wildlife in the area include bats, black bear, coyotes, red fox, gray fox, bobcat, lynx, mountain lion, mule deer, elk, black tailed deer, pronghorn, badger, striped skunk, spotted skunk, porcupine, rockchuck, rabbits, squirrels, chipmunks, raccoons, snakes, and other assorted small mammals, reptiles, and amphibians.

Astronomy 
In 2021, Prineville Reservoir State Park was announced as an IDA Dark Sky Place, the first in Oregon. The group that uses this state park for parties or activities is the Oregon Observatory, which hosts their annual star party at the day use area.

See also
List of lakes in Oregon

References 

http://www.oregonstateparks.org/park_34.php
http://www.wanderthewest.com/articles/63/
http://www.fs.fed.us/r6/centraloregon/wildlife/sites/28-prinevillereservoir.shtml
http://www.fs.fed.us/r6/centraloregon/wildlife/species/mammals/index.shtml
http://www.lakelubbers.com/viewlake.cfm?lake=176

External links 
 
 

Reservoirs in Oregon
Lakes of Crook County, Oregon
Parks in Crook County, Oregon
State parks of Oregon
Buildings and structures in Crook County, Oregon
1961 establishments in Oregon